Saboten Bombers is an arcade game that was released in 1992. It was developed by NMK and published by Tecmo. It wouldn't receive a home release until it saw ports on the Nintendo Switch and PlayStation 4 as part of Hamster's Arcade Archives lineup on April 8th, 2021.

Gameplay
Saboten Bombers is a single screen platform game. The main character is an anthropomorphic cactus. The gameplay consists of throwing bombs at the enemies, and avoiding being hit by the enemy bombs. There are a variety of enemies and colorful backgrounds. The game has over 50 levels, and also a versus mode. The game has many collectables, the most notable of which is the cake which gives the player an extra life after collecting 8 pieces.

Reception 
In Japan, Game Machine listed Saboten Bombers on their May 15, 1992 issue as being the twelfth most popular table arcade unit at the time.

References 

1992 video games
Arcade video games
Arcade-only video games
Nintendo Switch games
NMK (company) games
Platform games
Tecmo games
PlayStation 4 games
Video games developed in Japan
Hamster Corporation games
Hamster Corporation franchises